Ricardo Ribas (born 8 October 1977) is a Portuguese long distance runner who specialises in the marathon. He competed in the men's marathon event at the 2016 Summer Olympics.

References

External links
 

1977 births
Living people
Portuguese male long-distance runners
Portuguese male marathon runners
Place of birth missing (living people)
Athletes (track and field) at the 2016 Summer Olympics
Olympic athletes of Portugal
S.L. Benfica athletes
Olympic male marathon runners